Gerard Noel may refer to:

 Sir Gerard Noel, 2nd Baronet (1759–1838), British MP
 Gerard Noel (politician) (1823–1911), British MP
 Gerard Noel (Royal Navy officer) (1845–1918), Royal Navy admiral of the fleet
 Gerard Noel (editor) (1926–2016), fellow of the Royal Society of Literature
 Gerard Noel (Wiccan), co-founder of the Witchcraft Research Association
 Gerard Thomas Noel (1782–1851), English cleric, son of the 2nd Baronet